Vazov is a crater on Mercury.  Its name was adopted by the International Astronomical Union (IAU) in 2020. The crater is named for Bulgarian poet Ivan Vazov.

There are two irregular depressions in the crater floor, which may be volcanic vents.

References

Impact craters on Mercury